Mostafalu (also Romanized as Moşţafálū and Moşţafālū; also known as Mustafali) is a village in Sanjabad-e Sharqi Rural District, in the Central District of Khalkhal County, Ardabil Province, Iran. At the 2006 census, its population was 496, in 91 families.

References 

Tageo

Towns and villages in Khalkhal County